Pierre Février (21 March 1696 – 5 November 1760) was a French baroque composer, organist and harpsichordist.

Biography 
Born in Abbeville in 1696, he arrived in Paris in 1720 and served as titular organist of two churches on Saint-Honoré street: the Jacobins' church (destroyed at the Revolution) and  Saint-Roch (still standing). Claude-Bénigne Balbastre, who moved to Paris in 1750, was among his pupils and eventually succeeded Février at Saint-Roch. Pierre Février died in Paris on 5 November 1760.

Works 
Two volumes of his harpsichord pieces are extant. The first one is dated 1734 and contains five suites:
 Suite in A major
 Allemande la Magnanime
 Le Concert des Dieux - Double du concert
 La Délectable
 Le Berceau
 La Boufonne ou la Paysanne
 Suite in D minor
 Fugue
 Courante
 Les Plaisirs des Sens
 Le Labyrinthe
 Ariette et doubles
 Suite in B minor
 Fugue
 L'Intrépide
 La Grotesque
 Suite in D major
 Gavotte et doubles
 Le Brinborion
 Le Tendre Language
 Tambourin
 Suite (Festes de Campagne) in C major
 Entrée
 Musette
 2 Menuets
 Le Gros Colas et la Grosse Jeanne
 Les Petites Bergères

The second volume, composed after 1734 and before 1737, was discovered in the late 1990s in a private collection in Belgium (Arenberg). It contains two harpsichord suites that follow a similar pattern, mixing dances and descriptive pièces de caractère in the typical late Baroque French tradition:

 1st Suite in G Minor
 Les Liens Harmoniques - Rondeau
 La Caressante - Rondeau
 La Fertillante
 La petite Coquette
 Tambourin - Rondeau
 2nd Suite in C Minor
 Allemande
 Les Tendres Tourterelles - Rondeau
 Les Croisades - Rondeau
 Menuet

See also
 French baroque harpsichordists

External links
 
 La Sala del Cembalo del caro Sassone Pièces de clavecin, Premier livre, 1734. The World Premiere Recording of the first book, as recorded by the harpsichordist Fernando De Luca (Rome, December 2008), is freely available in streaming on this non-profit website devoted to the ancient music and harpsichord baroque music.
 Vulcain dupé par l'amour, a cantatille available on the BnF website.

French Baroque composers
French male classical composers
French harpsichordists
French classical organists
French male organists
1696 births
1760 deaths
People from Abbeville
18th-century keyboardists
18th-century classical composers
18th-century French composers
18th-century French male musicians
17th-century male musicians
Male classical organists